"Oooh This I Need" is the final single from American singer Elisa Fiorillo, released as the second single from her 1990 album I Am in early 1991. The song was written and produced by Prince, who had worked with Fiorillo on the album, where he wrote five tracks.

Background
Released as the follow-up single to Fiorillo's 1990 hit "On the Way Up", which had peaked at #27 on the U.S. Billboard Hot 100, "Oooh This I Need" failed to replicate the leading single's success. The song peaked at #90 on the U.S. Billboard Hot 100 around March 1991, where it stayed on the chart for a total of 4 weeks.

In The Network Forty magazine, the song had peaked at #33 on Network Forty's CD TuneUp chart, whilst also receiving a positive review.

In a March 8, 1991, issue of the Chicago Tribune, the song was mentioned in the Take 2 section which was based as a Friday guide to movies and music. The song was included under the first section "Ten must-play records for an evening on the dance floor. Nominated by Joe Smooth, deejay at the Warehouse."

Release
The single was released in America only, on 12" vinyl, CD and cassette.

The promotional-only one-track CD issue of the single featured the a-side track only whilst the cassette version of the single featured the album version of the a-side, along with the album track "Purpose in Your Life" as the b-side.

The 12" vinyl release was promotional only and aimed at the dance chart. Two remixes of the song were created by New Jersey-based duo Blaze, with the a-side being "Oooh This I Need (Below The Ground Mix)" and the b-side being "Oooh This I Need (Laid Back Mix)". This release featured a red coloured vinyl.

Both the cassette and CD releases featured similar artwork, using the same picture of Fiorillo, whilst the cassette version used a black background and the CD version used a white background. The 12" vinyl release featured no artwork but a basic sticker on the top right corner labeling the artist and the single title.

Promotion
Unlike "On the Way Up", no music video was created for the single, however the song was performed on national TV. The song was mimed on the half-hour late-night American musical variety show The Party Machine, presented by Nia Peeples. The song was also performed along with the album track "Love's No Fun" on the American variety/talk show The Arsenio Hall Show, which aired late weeknights, presented by Arsenio Hall. This performance featured both live instrumentation and vocal, where both songs performed were shortened and merged into one four-minute track. Finally the song was performed on the American syndicated music television show Showtime At The Apollo, produced by the Apollo Theater. This version featured live instrumentation and vocal, also using the same two backing female dancers/vocalists as on The Arsenio Hall Show.

In Hits magazine, a full A4-sized promotional poster was released in a February 1991 issue, using the same image of Fiorillo as pictured on the single's artwork.

Track listing
Cassette Single
"Oooh This I Need" - 4:00
"Purpose In Your Life" - 4:07

CD Single (American promo)
"Oooh This I Need" - 4:00

12" Vinyl Single (American promo)
"Oooh This I Need (Below The Ground Mix)" - 6:09
"Oooh This I Need (Laid Back Mix)" - 4:09

Critical reception
In The Network Forty magazine, a review of the song appeared under the magazine's N40 Music Meeting section, where the song was at #33 on Network Forty's CD TuneUp chart. The review wrote "Now 21, Elisa Fiorillo has definitely shed any trace of her younger past. Turning up the steam with producer David Z of the Prince camp in Minneapolis, Fiorillo projects a genuine voice and style well beyond her years. Reminiscent of Sheena Easton's recent comeback via her string of successful Prince duets, the mix of erotic production with this Pop voice is quite intriguing. Keeping the eclectic mix going is a catchy Pop hook, thrown an occasional curve by some very arty guitar work. It sounds like once this package gets going, it will be impossible to stop."

On February 10, 1991, a review of the I Am album by the Pittsburgh Post-Gazette spoke of the song, stating "Fiorillo gives a sultry, steamy turn to the dreamy "Ooh, This I Need," and "Love's No Fun.""

In a December 9, 1990, review of the I Am album by the New Straits Times, the song was described, along with four other album tracks, as "very Prince-ly indeed" and that on an overall album note "Fiorillo's singing has enough thrust to cut it most of the time."

Chart performance

Personnel

Oooh This I Need
 Elisa Fiorillo - vocals
 Levi Seacer Jr. - bass
 Prince - writer, producer
 Michael Koppelman - recorded by, mixer, harpsichord
 Rosie Gaines - backing vocals
 Michael Bland - acoustic drums
 Kirk Johnson - electric drums
 Blaze - 12" Vinyl Remixes

Purpose in Your Life
 Elisa Fiorillo - vocals, writer
 David Z. - producer, percussion, recorded by, mixer, writer
 Levi Seacer Jr. - all instruments, writer, co-producer

References

1991 singles
Songs written by Prince (musician)
Song recordings produced by Prince (musician)
1990 songs
Chrysalis Records singles